Heino Falcke (born 26 September 1966) is a German Dutch professor of radio astronomy and astroparticle physics at the Radboud University Nijmegen. He was a winner of the 2011 Spinoza Prize. His main field of study is black holes, and he is the originator of the concept of the 'black hole shadow'. In 2013, a team under his lead earned a 14 million euro research grant from the European Research Council to further studies of black holes. In 2019, Falcke announced the first Event Horizon Telescope results at the EHT Press Conference in Brussels.

Career
Falcke was born in Cologne, Germany in 1966. He studied physics at the University of Cologne from 1986 to 1987, and then at the University of Bonn from 1987 where he graduated with a Diploma (equivalent to a master's degree) in Physics in 1992. He subsequently obtained a PhD degree in Astronomy summa cum laude in 1994 from the University of Bonn. Falcke subsequently worked as a scientist for the Max Planck Institute for Radio Astronomy in Bonn, the University of Maryland, and the University of Arizona. He was conferred a Habilitation by the University of Bonn in 2000.

Falcke won the Ludwig Biermann Award for young astronomers of the German Astronomische Gesellschaft in 2000.

In 2003, he became adjunct professor of Radio Astronomy and Astroparticle physics at Radboud University Nijmegen. He also started working for ASTRON, the radio astronomy institute of the Netherlands. In 2007, he became a full professor at Nijmegen.

In 2006, Falcke won the Academy Prize of the Berlin-Brandenburg Academy of Sciences and Humanities.

Falcke received an Advanced Research Grant of the European Research Council of 3.5 million euro in 2008. In 2011, he was one of three winners of the Dutch Spinoza Prize and received a 2.5 million euro grant. The organization presenting the award, the Netherlands Organisation for Scientific Research, praised Falcke for providing new insights regarding black holes. They also called him one of the leading forces behind the radio telescope LOFAR. Falcke worked on the design of the telescope.

In 2013, Falcke, as lead scientist of a team, received a European Research Council Synergy grant of 14 million euros. The grant was intended for further studies of black holes, specifically Sagittarius A*. The goal was to construct a Black Hole Camera with the grant. This would allow testing of Albert Einstein's general theory of relativity by creating an image of the event horizon. This project culminated into the Event Horizon Telescope project; within this project, Falcke is the chair of the  EHT Science Council. On 10 April 2019, he announced that the project managed to create an image of the black holes at the centre of the Milky Way (Sagittarius A*) and M87 (M87*).

Falcke was elected a member of the Academia Europaea in 2013. He was elected a member of the Royal Netherlands Academy of Arts and Sciences in 2014.

Research
Falcke is involved in theoretical astronomy as well as observational and experimental studies. Apart from his work with LOFAR, he is also involved in the development of the Square Kilometre Array.

In 2000 he predicted it would be possible to make measurements near the edge of a black hole. Four years later, his team managed to do that. In 2013, Falcke, together with Luciano Rezzolla of the Max Planck Institute for Gravitational Physics proposed that blitzars could be an explanation for fast radio bursts. Blitzars would occur when a supramassive rotating neutron star slows down enough, loses its magnetic field, and then turns into a black hole.

Falcke predicted that near the edges of a black hole, there would be a 'black hole shadow' that could be detected by a radio telescope. This shadow was eventually observed with the Event Horizon Telescope.

Falcke wishes to place a radio telescope on the Moon and has worked with NASA and European Space Agency researchers to devise a plan to make this happen.

Personal life
Falcke is a devout Christian and serves as lay pastor in the Protestant Church in the Netherlands. He views his faith as a way of achieving internal rest, as well as a motivation to conduct science.

References

External links
 

1966 births
Living people
21st-century German astronomers
German astrophysicists
German Protestants
Members of Academia Europaea
Members of the Royal Netherlands Academy of Arts and Sciences
Academic staff of Radboud University Nijmegen
Scientists from Cologne
Spinoza Prize winners
University of Bonn alumni
University of Cologne alumni